Valery Dushkov (born 10 August 1953) is Russian-born Ukrainian football coach and a former footballer.

He was born in the city of Kospash (today part of Kizel), Perm Oblast. Dushkov started his coaching career as a playing coach in Okhtyrka.

In 2012–2016 he was helping Mykhailo Fomenko with the Ukraine national football team.

External links
  Interview of Dushkov after being appointed an assistant manager in Tavriya
  Interview at ua-football.com as a manager of Tavriya
 

1953 births
Living people
People from Kizel
Russian footballers
Soviet footballers
Ukrainian football managers
Soviet football managers
FC Naftovyk Okhtyrka managers
FC Polissya Zhytomyr managers
FC Spartak Sumy managers
FC Nyva Ternopil managers
FC Nyva Vinnytsia managers
FC Spartak Ivano-Frankivsk managers
Expatriate football managers in Libya
Ukrainian Premier League managers
Association football forwards
FC Salyut Belgorod players
Sportspeople from Perm Krai